Sydney Inlet Provincial Park is a provincial park in the Clayoquot Sound region of the west coast of Vancouver Island, British Columbia, Canada, located north of the settlement of Hot Springs Cove and northwest of the resort town of Tofino. Sydney Inlet was the name of the post office in the area from its creation in 1947 to 1948, when it was renamed Hot Springs Cove, though that post office was subsequently closed in 1974.

The park contains heritage and cultural sites of the Nuu-chah-nulth peoples. The  park was identified for protection by the Clayoqout Land-Use Decision in 1995 and was created by amends to parks legislation on July 13 of that year.  Physiographically, Sydney Inlet is considered one of the best examples of a fjord on Vancouver Island. The inlet is fed by the Sydney River, which has a large population of Chinook salmon.

See also
Clayoquot Sound Biosphere Reserve

References

External links

BC Parks info page

Clayoquot Sound region